This is a list of universities in the Dominican Republic.

Charles Bekeev International University Puerto Plata Business School
Facultad Latinoamericana de Ciencias Sociales Facultad Latinoamericana de Ciencias Sociales
Instituto Superior para la Defensa
Instituto Tecnológico de Santo Domingo Instituto Tecnológico de Santo Domingo
Instituto Tecnológico del Cibao Oriental Instituto Tecnológico del Cibao Oriental
ISAL institute - first accredited online university in Dominica
Pontificia Universidad Católica Madre y Maestra
Stevens Institute of Technology International
Universidad Abierta Para Adultos
Universidad Adventista Dominicana
Universidad Agroforestal Fernando Arturo de Meriño
Universidad Alternativa Medicina
Universidad APEC
Universidad Autónoma de Santo Domingo
Universidad Católica Nordestana
Universidad Católica Santo Domingo
Universidad Católica Tecnológica de Barahona
Universidad Católica Tecnológica del Cibao
Universidad Central del Este
Universidad Central Dominicana de Estudios Profesionales
Universidad de la Tercera Edad
Universidad del Caribe
Universidad Domínico-Americana
Universidad Eugenio María de Hostos
Universidad Experimental Félix Adam
Universidad Federico Henríquez y Carvajal
Universidad Iberoamericana
Universidad Interamericana
Universidad Nacional Evangélica
Universidad Nacional Pedro Henríquez Ureña
Universidad Nacional Tecnológica
Universidad Odontológica Dominicana
Universidad Organización y Método
Universidad Psicología Industrial Dominicana
Universidad Tecnológica de Santiago
Universidad Tecnológica del Sur
Universidad Ulises Francisco Espaillat

See also

 List of schools in the Dominican Republic

References

Universities
Universities
Dominican Republic

Dominican Republic